Pathology is an American death metal band from San Diego, California, formed in 2006 by drummer Dave Astor (previously with The Locust and Cattle Decapitation). The band were signed to Victory Records for an over three-year period, but now are currently signed to Nuclear Blast Records.

History 
In 2006, the band released Surgically Hacked (Amputated Vein Records) which was followed by a full-length debut Incisions of Perverse Debauchery (Grindhead Records) and then Age of Onset (Comatose Records, 2009), the album which led to a contract with Victory Records where the acclaimed Legacy of the Ancients was released on July 6, 2010.

The band began extensive touring (with Nile, with Immolation, Vader, Obituary and Deicide, and with Deströyer 666, among others) but in November a horrible van accident derailed the band from continuing. At that point, the original vocalist Matti Way was replaced by Jonathan Huber (formerly of I Declare War). Guitarist Tim Tiszczenko, who at one point departed to be replaced by Kevin Schwartz, returned to form a guitar tandem with the latter. In May 2011, it was announced that Pathology would enter Lambesis Studios that summer with producer Daniel Castleman to begin working on a new full-length expected in Autumn. On August 30, the band was to start the US tour supporting Grave and Blood Red Throne.

On December 18, 2012, it was announced via the band's official site that they have fulfilled their three-album contract with Victory Records and that both original vocalist Matti Way and original guitarist Tim Tiszczenko have returned to the band. It was also announced that they will have a new album out later in 2013 on their new underground label Sevared Records. Vocalist Jonathan Huber left the band in December of that same year because Astor allegedly did not want the band to tour anymore and Huber stated that there was "no point in being in a non-touring band."

Pathology released their seventh full-length studio album Lords of Rephaim on September 3, 2013.

After a successful $4,000 Kickstarter campaign, Pathology released their eighth full-length album Throne of Reign on August 5, 2014.

Band members 
Current members
 Dave Astor – drums (2006–present)
 Daniel Richardson – guitars (2018–present)
 Richard Jackson – bass (2018–present)
 Obie Flett – vocals (2018–present)

Former members
 Nick Gervais – guitars (2007)
 Tim Tiszczenko – guitar (2006–2010, 2012–2018), bass (2006–2008, 2012–2016, 2018), vocals (2006–2008, 2008)
 Matti Way – vocals (2008–2010, 2012–2018)
 Levi Fuselier – vocals (2008)
 Oscar Ramirez – bass (2010–2012, 2016–2018)
 Kevin Schwartz – guitar (2010–2012)
 Diego Sanchez – guitar (2010)
 Jonathan Huber – vocals (2011–2012)

Timeline

Discography 

Studio albums
 Surgically Hacked (2006)
 Incisions of Perverse Debauchery (2008)
 Age of Onset (2009)
 Legacy of the Ancients (2010)
 Awaken to the Suffering (2011)
 The Time of Great Purification (2012)
 Lords of Rephaim (2013)
 Throne of Reign (2014)
 Pathology (2017)
 Reborn to Kill (2019)
 The Everlasting Plague (2021)

Singles 
"Code Injection" (2010)
"Tyrannical Decay" (2012)

References

External links

Victory Records artists
Musical groups from San Diego
Death metal musical groups from California
Deathgrind musical groups
Musical groups established in 2006
Sevared Records artists